Meterana levis is a species of moth in the family Noctuidae. This species is endemic to New Zealand.

References

Noctuinae
Moths of New Zealand
Endemic fauna of New Zealand
Moths described in 1905
Taxa named by Alfred Philpott
Endemic moths of New Zealand